Benoît Delbecq (born 6 June 1966) is a French pianist and composer.

Early life
Benoît Delbecq was born in Saint-Germain-en-Laye,  and raised in a musical environment. He started studying piano in Bougival at the age of seven with Nicolle Mollard, a former student of Alfred Cortot. He first studied jazz harmony with parisian pianist Jean-Pierre Fouquey, then joined IACP in Paris (in 1982), a jazz and improvised music school founded and directed by bassist Alan Silva, while he continued high school and furthermore sound engineering studies. In 1983 he met Mal Waldron who encouraged him to work on his own music. As he had become an assistant director for films as well as an assistant in sound engineering, Delbecq finally opted to become a professional musician after attending the Banff Centre Jazz Workshop, Canada, in the summer of 1987, where he studied with Dave Holland, Steve Coleman and Muhal Richard Abrams among others. He then studied composition and music analysis with Solange Ancona at the Versailles National Conservatory, studied with pianist Georges Delvallée at Cachan Conservatory. Together with saxophonist Guillaume Orti from France, he went back again to the Banff Jazz workshop in the summer of 1990 where he studied under the direction of Steve Coleman. There he met peers like pianists Ethan Iverson and Andy Milne, saxophonists Tony Malaby and Jorrit Dijsktra, and trumpeter Ralph Alessi among others, as well as British drummer Steve Argüelles, a long-term collaborator.

Later life and career
Since 1989, Delbecq has participated in nearly a hundred and fifty records. He performs solo piano and solo electronics ("MadMacs"), leads or co-leads a number of bands from duos to quintets, and is involved in many multi-disciplinary productions of theater, dance, the visual arts, cinema, radio etc.

Awards
Benoît was awarded the Prix de la Sacem in 1995 (with collective Kartet). He was also awarded the Prix de la Villa Médicis Hors les Murs in 2001 and the Civitella Foundation (NY) fellowship in 2009. Both The Sixth Jump and Circles and Calligrams (songlines) were awarded a Grand Prix International de l'Académie Charles Cros,

Selected discography

As leader/co-leader

References

1966 births
Living people
Musicians from Paris
French jazz pianists
French male pianists
20th-century French composers
21st-century French composers
French male composers
21st-century pianists
20th-century French male musicians
21st-century French male musicians
French male jazz musicians
RogueArt artists